Baker House is a modernist house located in Bacchus Marsh, in the outskirts of Melbourne. The house, designed by Robin Boyd, was built between 1964 and 1966. Originally built as a family home for Dr. Michael Baker, the property is now used for private functions. The house, along with two other buildings on the site, was added to the Victorian Heritage Register in 2007, having remained relatively untouched since its construction.

Description

The house is square in plan, surrounded by twelve stone cylinders topped by a shallow pyramid roof, while at the centre lies a large courtyard beneath a flywire roof. Due to its remote location, the site was not originally connected to water or electricity. Because of this the house had to collect and store rainwater, so several of the stone cylinders house water tanks. The house also features a large schoolroom for the owner's homeschooled children. Internally, the private functions and services of the house line the walls of the courtyard with small windows onto the courtyard, leaving large open plan spaces along the perimeter of the building. The perimeter walls are fully glazed, opening onto deep verandas which allow for circulation inside the house.
The main living space was originally heated by a large fireplace, however this proved to be ineffective, and the owners subsequently provided several extra wood burning heaters throughout the house.

Key influences and design approach
Boyd put much effort into considering the unique conditions of Australia and subsequently developed a style "related to Australian materials and conditions, to [the] light and its connection to Australian landscape". References to the work of Walter Burley Griffin are evident with large living spaces or courtyards becoming the centre of the house. The influence of Louis Kahn is also evident in the floor plan, where Boyd creates a sense of formality in the layout through the use of a perfect square.  The use of such geometry also reflects the client’s profession as a mathematician and was described as "a plan of noughts and crosses".

Originally planned to be constructed from concrete, the house instead utilised locally quarried stone, adding to the rustic qualities of the house, drawing on colonial influences in the design. Boyd described the process as "like designing a house for Robinson Crusoe."
At the time of construction there was a large emphasis on the texture, warmth and weathering of materials, influencing the use of stone both externally and internally, the straw ceilings and the bare concrete floors. These tough and low maintenance materials reflect the conditions of the surrounding Australian bushland.

Dower House and Library
After its completion in 1966, another house was commissioned for the owner’s mother-in-law, originally known as the Elizabeth Strickland house. Using the same local stone, Boyd designed a smaller house again with a square plan, although instead of the rigid geometry of the Baker House, the Dower House features a freeform stone wall running throughout.

In 1979, the owners commissioned Roy Grounds, Boyd’s former partner, to design a small library on the site. His design complements those of Boyd through use of similar materials whilst contrasting with the formal style of the two houses.

Gallery

See also
 Heritage listed buildings in Melbourne

References

External links
 Boyd Baker House website
 Robin Boyd Foundation

Heritage-listed buildings in Melbourne
Houses in Victoria (Australia)
Bacchus Marsh
Buildings and structures in the City of Melton
1966 establishments in Australia
Houses completed in 1966